The yellow-eyed black flycatcher (Melaenornis ardesiacus) is a small passerine bird of the genus Melaenornis in the flycatcher family Muscicapidae native to the Albertine Rift montane forests.

References

yellow-eyed black flycatcher
Birds of Sub-Saharan Africa
yellow-eyed black flycatcher